Centrochir crocodili is the only species in the genus Centrochir of the catfish (order Siluriformes) family Doradidae. This species is endemic to Colombia where it is found in the Magdalena River basin and reaches a length of  SL.

References

Doradidae
Endemic fauna of Colombia
Freshwater fish of Colombia
Magdalena River
Fish described in 1829
Taxa named by Louis Agassiz
Taxa named by Alexander von Humboldt
Monotypic freshwater fish genera
Monotypic ray-finned fish genera
Catfish genera